Doug White may refer to:

 Doug White (baseball), American baseball coach
 Doug White (news anchor) (1944–2006), American news anchor
 Doug White (politician), American politician in the Ohio House of Representatives (1991-1996) and Senate (1996-2004)

See also
 Douglas White (disambiguation)